Pebbles Flintstone (also known as Pebbles Flintstone-Rubble as an adult) is a fictional character in the Flintstones franchise. The red-haired daughter of Fred and Wilma Flintstone, Pebbles is born near the end of the third season. She is most famous in her infant form on The Flintstones, but has also appeared at various other ages, including as a teenager on the early 1970s spin-off The Pebbles and Bamm-Bamm Show and as an adult in three television films. She spent most of her time with Bamm-Bamm Rubble, her childhood best friend whom she eventually marries.

Fictional character biography
According to the February 22, 1963, edition of TV Guide, Pebbles was born at the Bedrock Rockapedic Hospital on February 22, 10,000 BC. That particular year was never actually cited within the show itself; most versions of the show put the Flintstones' era as around 1,000,000 BC.

As an infant, Pebbles quickly became lifelong best friends with her next-door neighbor, Bamm-Bamm Rubble.

As a pre-teen, Pebbles was an excellent baseball player, which led to a misadventure involving her father, as seen in the 1978 primetime special The Flintstones: Little Big League.

By the time she was a teenager, Pebbles began dating Bamm-Bamm and was noted for getting their friends into various misadventures, mostly due to sharing her dad's penchant for schemes that would inevitably backfire (such as causing a strike by Bedrock's city employees when she was elected honorary mayor for a week). Her friends and she attended Bedrock High School; Pebbles had a catchphrase similar to her father's: "Yabba-Dabba-Doozie!"

As an adult, Pebbles pursued a career in advertising and married Bamm-Bamm. After this, the newly married couple moved to Hollyrock, a fictional, prehistoric version of Hollywood, California. They eventually had a son named Chip and a daughter named Roxy, who were fraternal twins.

Chronology
Through the various Flintstones incarnations, the age of Pebbles has varied widely, appearing as an adolescent in one spin-off and as an infant again in the next. Arranged roughly in chronological order, the Flintstones incarnations in which Pebbles has made appearances are:

Infant/toddler
 The Flintstones
 The Man Called Flintstone
 The New Fred and Barney Show
 The Flintstones' New Neighbors
 The Flintstones: Fred's Final Fling
 The Flintstones: Wind-Up Wilma
 The Flintstones: Jogging Fever
 A Flintstones Christmas Carol
 Cave Kids
 The Flintstones & WWE: Stone Age SmackDown!

Child/preteen
 A Flintstone Christmas The Flintstones: Little Big League The Flintstones Movie (live-action)
 Yabba Dabba DinosaursTeenager
 The Pebbles and Bamm-Bamm Show The Flintstone Comedy Hour Hanna-Barbera Educational Filmstrips – featuring Information Please, A Weighty Problem, Fire Alarm, Fire Escape and Driving Guide The Flintstone Comedy Show The Flintstone FunniesAdult
 I Yabba-Dabba Do! 
 Hollyrock-a-Bye Baby A Flintstone Family Christmas BedrockCharacter marketing
In 1963, when Hanna-Barbera decided to add a baby to the show, their first choice was a boy. When Ideal Toy Company heard this, company executives approached Hanna-Barbera with a proposal to change the baby character to a girl for which the toymaker could create a doll, and Hanna-Barbera agreed.

Pebbles, in her conventional toddler incarnation, is sometimes seen in the various Post Fruity Pebbles and Cocoa Pebbles cereal commercials that have been produced over the years. 
Pebbles also appears on the packages of "Flintstones" children's vitamins and with Bamm-Bamm on the packages of "Flintstones" toddler vitamins, which are manufactured by Bayer Healthcare (formerly Miles Laboratories).

Portrayal
 Infant Pebbles was voiced by Jean Vander Pyl, who also voiced her mother, Wilma.
 Pebbles has been voiced over the years by Sally Struthers, Mickey Stevens, Russi Taylor, Megan Mullally, Tress MacNeille, Kath Soucie, Pamela Anderson, Aria Curzon, Grey DeLisle, and Jessica DiCicco.
 Pebbles appeared in the 1994 live-action Flintstones movie, where she was played by twins Elaine and Melanie Silver.
 Pebbles appeared in the couch gag for The Simpsons episode "Kamp Krusty".
 Pebbles appeared in the I Am Weasel episode "I Am My Lifetime" as an old woman along with Hanna-Barbera elderly characters.
 Pebbles appeared in the Family Guy episode "Quagmire's Baby", during a police chase.
 Pebbles and Bamm-Bamm appeared in a cameo as background characters in the 2010 series Scooby-Doo! Mystery Incorporated, in the episode "Revenge of the Man Crab", portrayed as teenagers.
 Infant Pebbles and Bamm-Bamm have cameo appearances in the 2020 Animaniacs revival segment "Suffragette City".
 Pebbles and Bamm-Bamm make a cameo in the Looney Tunes film Space Jam: A New Legacy''.

References

Fictional baseball players
The Flintstones characters
Hanna-Barbera characters
Child characters in animated television series
Post Foods characters
Television characters introduced in 1963
Animated human characters
Fictional infants
Female characters in animated series
Female characters in advertising